Kishen Pattnaik  (30 June 1930 – 27 September 2004) was an Indian social leader, socialist thinker, author and activist. As a member of Parliament for the 3rd Lok Sabha, he represented the Praja Socialist Party for the Sambalpur Constituency of India. 
 Pattnaik founded and edited a Hindi monthly periodical called Samayik Varta.

Early life
Kishen Pattnaik was born in Kalahandi State, located in the forest-covered region of Kashipur. Currently, it is Kasipur Block of Rayagada Dist.  As a child, he attended a school named Tati Ghera, where his father worked as a teacher.  After moving to his maternal uncle's house in Bhawanipatna, he enrolled in classes in 1946 in Rajendra College, Bolangir.  He then received his Bachelors and Master of Arts at the University in Nagpur. In 1951, he returned to Bhawanipatna and began teaching at the Braja Mohan High School.

Social Work
After numerous deaths due to starvation were reported in the Kalahandi district, Pattnaik and activist Kapil Narayan Tiwari filed a public interest litigation against the State of Odisha.

Political Activism and Election
In 1962, 27-year-old Kishen Pattnaik became one of the youngest candidates elected from the Sambalpur parliamentary constituency.

In 1995, along with leaders like Jugal Kishore Roybir, Bhai Vaidya and emerging youths like Sunil, Adv. Joshy Jacob, Kishen Pattnaik co-founded Samajwadi Jana Parishad.

Publications

References

1930 births
2004 deaths
Lok Sabha members from Odisha
Indian independence activists from Odisha
Indian social reformers
People from Bhawanipatna
India MPs 1962–1967
Activists from Odisha
Indian schoolteachers
Scholars from Odisha
People from Sambalpur district
Praja Socialist Party politicians
Social leaders